Tieghemella africana is a tree species of the genus Tieghemella in the plant family Sapotaceae. It occurs in Cameroon, the Republic of the Congo, Gabon, and Sierra Leone and is threatened by habitat loss and overharvesting.

References

africana
Endangered plants
Taxonomy articles created by Polbot
Plants described in 1890